The 35th Armored Regiment is a regiment of the United States Army first established in 1941. The lineage of the regiment is carried on by the 1st Battalion 35th Armored Regiment, currently attached to the 2nd Brigade Combat Team, 1st Armored Division.

Distinctive Unit Insignia
 Description
A Silver color and metal enamel device 1 1/8 inches (2.86 cm) in height overall blazoned as follows:  Vert, an armadillo passant Argent, langued Gules. Attached above from a wreath Argent and Vert, a fleur-de-lis Gules in front of palm branch of the first. Attached below a tripartite Silver scroll inscribed "VINCERE" "VEL" "MORI" in Green letters.
 Symbolism
The shield is green, the color of the Armored Force. The armadillo, being characterized by the qualities of invulnerability, ferociousness, protection, and cunning endurance, alludes to the elements which are vital if the organization is to pursue successfully its duties. The palm is for military victory. The fleur-de-lis commemorates World War II service in France. The color red symbolizes courage. The motto translates to "To Conquer or Die".
 Background
The distinctive unit insignia was originally approved for the 35th Armored Regiment on 1 June 1942. It was redesignated for the 35th Tank Battalion on 12 November 1943. The insignia was redesignated for the 35th Constabulary Squadron on 29 November 1946. It was redesignated for the 35th Tank Battalion and amended by the addition of a crest on 20 August 1956. It was amended to change the description on 14 March 1957. The insignia was redesignated for the 35th Armor Regiment on 22 September 1958.

Coat of Arms

Blazon
 Shield
Vert, an armadillo passant Argent, langued Gules.
 Crest
From a wreath Argent and Vert, a fleur-de-lis Gules in front of a palm branch of the first.
Motto
VINCERE VEL MORI (To Conquer Or Die).
Symbolism
 Shield
The shield is green, the color of the Armored Force. The armadillo, being characterized by the qualities of invulnerability, ferociousness, protection, and cunning endurance, alludes to the elements which are vital if the organization is to pursue successfully its duties.
 Crest
The palm is for military victory. The fleur-de-lis commemorates World War II service in France.
 Background
The coat of arms was originally approved for the 35th Armored Regiment on 30 May 1942. It was redesignated for the 35th Tank Battalion on 12 November 1943. The insignia was redesignated for the 35th Constabulary Squadron on 26 November 1946. It was redesignated for the 35th Tank Battalion and amended by the addition of a crest on 20 August 1956. It was amended to change the blazon on 14 March 1957. The insignia was redesignated for the 35th Armor Regiment on 22 September 1958.

Current configuration
 1st Battalion, 35th Armored Regiment
 2d Battalion, 35th Armored Regiment
 3d Battalion, 35th Armored Regiment
 4th Battalion, 35th Armored Regiment

See also
 List of armored and cavalry regiments of the United States Army

References

 Historical register and dictionary of the United States Army, from ..., Volume 1 By Francis Bernard Heitman 
 Encyclopedia of United States Army insignia and uniforms By William K. Emerson (page 51).

External links
 https://web.archive.org/web/20110513005759/http://www.history.army.mil/html/forcestruc/lineages/branches/ar/default.htm
 https://web.archive.org/web/20110513005804/http://www.history.army.mil/html/forcestruc/lineages/branches/cav/default.htm

035
Military units and formations established in 1941